Luca Pianca (born 1958) is a Swiss musician-lutenist whose specialty is  archlute.  In 1985 he co - founded Il Giardino Armonico., a pioneering Italian early-music ensemble based in Milan.  He has premiered works by the contemporary lutenist-composer Roman Turovsky-Savchuk at international festivals, and received numerous international awards for his recordings.

Early life and education
Luca Pianca was born in Lugano, Switzerland of ethnic Italian ancestry.  He studied with Nikolaus Harnoncourt at the Mozarteum University of Salzburg, Austria.

Career
Since 1982 Pianca has collaborated with Concentus Musicus Wien.  He also served as a lutenist at Zurich Opera House. In 1985 he was co-founder of Il Giardino Armonico (The Harmonic Garden), an Italian early-music ensemble that pioneered performances of many Baroque and contemporary works.

Luca Pianca has recorded more than 20 CDs, both with and without Il Giardino Armonico, including complete recordings of lute repertoire by J.S.Bach and Antonio Vivaldi.
He has partnered with internationally known opera singers and soloists such as Italian Cecilia Bartoli, Eva Mei, and American Sylvia McNair.

Since 1999, Pianca has teamed with viola da gamba player Vittorio Ghielmi to record numerous CDs.  Since 2001 he has also collaborated with the contemporary lutenist-composer Roman Turovsky-Savchuk, whose works he premiered at several international festivals: Urbino, Salamanca, Paris, and Vilnius, inter alia.

Honors and awards
 Five Diapason d'Or, Diapason (Tuning Fork) magazine
 Four Choc awards, Le Monde de la musique magazine
 Gramophone Award, 1996 (The Gramophone magazine, United Kingdom)
 Deutscher Schallplattenpreis (German Record Award), 1998

Discography 
Bagpipes from Hell — Music for Viola da gamba, Lyra-viol, Lute and Ceterone. 17th and 18th century, Vittorio Ghielmi, Luca Pianca, 1999
Pièces de caractère — Works by: Marais, Forqueray, Mouton, Dollé, Caix d'Hervelois, De Visée, Vittorio Ghielmi, Luca Pianca, 2002
Duo - German Music for Lute & Viol, Vittorio Ghielmi, Luca Pianca, 2005
Devil's Dream, Ghielmi, Pianca, Gibelli, 2006

References

Luca Pianca's official website -currently unavailable
 

Living people
1958 births
Mozarteum University Salzburg alumni
Swiss lutenists
People from Lugano